The brown bullfinch (Pyrrhula nipalensis) is a species of bird in the true finch family, Fringillidae. It is found in Bhutan, China, India, Malaysia, Myanmar, Nepal, Pakistan, Taiwan, and Vietnam. Its natural habitats are temperate forest and subtropical or tropical moist montane forest.

The brown bullfinch is a relatively small  bird with a grayish head, nape, and breast. Its diet consists of nuts and native conifers. In Bhutan or Vietnam, it may be seen in a pair or a group. Little is known about this species.

Taxonomy
The taxonomy was described in 2001 by Arnaiz-Villena et al. All birds of genus Pyrrhula have a common ancestor: Pinicola enucleator.

References

brown bullfinch
Birds of South China
Birds of the Himalayas
Birds of Myanmar
Birds of Eastern Himalaya
Birds of Taiwan
brown bullfinch
Taxonomy articles created by Polbot